Battle of Keelung may refer to:

Keelung Campaign (1884–1885)
Battle of Keelung (1895)